Frederick Charles Koster ["Fritz"] (December 21, 1905 – April 24, 1979) was an outfielder in Major League Baseball who played for the Philadelphia Phillies during the  season.

Koster attended the University of Louisville, where he played college baseball for the Cardinals from 1926 to 1928.

References

External links

1905 births
1979 deaths
Major League Baseball outfielders
Philadelphia Phillies players
Akron Tyrites players
Dallas Steers players
Jersey City Skeeters players
Little Rock Travelers players
Louisville Colonels (minor league) players
Pine Bluff Judges players
St. Paul Saints players
Syracuse Chiefs players
Toledo Mud Hens players
Waco Cubs players
Baseball players from Louisville, Kentucky
Louisville Cardinals baseball players